Loghin is a surname. Notable people with the surname include:

Diana Loghin (born 1997), Moldovan footballer
Irina Loghin (born 1939), Romanian singer and politician
Mihaela Loghin (born 1952), Romanian shot putter

Romanian-language surnames